The following is a list of every club which has competed in the FA Women's Super League - the highest level of women's football in England - since its inception in 2011. All statistics here refer to time in the WSL only (excludes Spring Series), with the exception of 'most recent finish' (which refers to all levels of play) and 'last promotion' (which refers to the club's last promotion from a lower tier). For the 'top scorer' and 'most appearances' columns, those in bold still play in the WSL for the club shown. WSL teams playing in the 2022–23 season are indicated in bold, while founding members are shown in italics. If the highest finish is that of the most recent season, then this is also shown in bold.

As of the start of the 2022–23 season, two teams - Arsenal and Chelsea - have competed in every FA WSL season since 2011.

Notes:

In addition, the following teams were members of the 2009–10 FA Women's Premier League - its final season as the national top division - but have never competed in WSL (teams listed in italics are members of the second-tier FA Women's Championship for the 2022–23 season):
 Blackburn Rovers
 Leeds United (as Leeds Carnegie)
 Millwall
 Nottingham Forest
 Watford

External links

References